"Hey, Hey, What Can I Do" is a song by the English rock band Led Zeppelin, released in 1970 as the B-side of the single "Immigrant Song" in the US.

Releases
After its release on a single, "Hey, Hey, What Can I Do" was included on the Atlantic Records compilation album The New Age of Atlantic in 1972. The song was first released on CD in September 1990, on the Led Zeppelin Boxed Set collection. In 1992, as a 20th-anniversary release, "Immigrant Song"/"Hey, Hey What Can I Do"  was issued as a "vinyl replica" CD single. 

In 1993, the song was included on The Complete Studio Recordings 10-CD box set, as one of four bonus tracks on the Coda disc as well as the subsequent 12-CD Led Zeppelin Definitive Collection box set released in 2008. In 2015, the song was also included on disc one of the two companion discs of the reissue of Coda.

See also
List of cover versions of Led Zeppelin songs"Hey, Hey, What Can I Do" entries

Footnotes

References

External links 

Led Zeppelin songs
1970 singles
1970 songs
Atlantic Records singles
Country rock songs
Song recordings produced by Jimmy Page
Songs written by Jimmy Page
Songs written by John Bonham
Songs written by John Paul Jones (musician)
Songs written by Robert Plant